The Reading Half Marathon (currently known as the Sage Reading Half Marathon for sponsorship reasons) is a half marathon road running event held on the streets of the English town of Reading, first held in 1983. The race is normally held on a Sunday in March or early April of each year. The race is open to everyone from fun runner to elite athlete, and was one of the first town races to include wheelchair athletes.

Due to the coronavirus pandemic, the race was cancelled in 2020, and the 2021 race was held in November. The 2022 race will be held on 3 April.

History 

The race was first run on 13 March 1983, and has been run every year since, with the exceptions of 2001, 2018, and 2020. From 2003 to 2018 the race was organised by Sweatshop, the chain of running equipment shops founded by Chris Brasher in 1971. From 2019 the race was organised by Goldline Events, who also organise the Ikano Bank Robin Hood Marathon Events and goGIRL (Brighton & Hove). Since 2018, the race has been sponsored by Sage, the publishers of accountancy software. Previously headline sponsors have included Digital, Asics, Mizuno and Vitality.

The 2019 race was held on Sunday 17 March, with more than 14,000 runners taking part. The 2020 edition of the race was cancelled due to the coronavirus pandemic, with all entries automatically transferred to 2021 and all registrants given the option of transferring their entry to another runner or to 2022.

Course

The Reading Half Marathon has had several courses over its life. The inaugural race in 1983, and several subsequent races, used University of Reading's Whiteknights Campus for both the start and finish. Other early courses involved use of the South Reading Leisure Centre and the Rivermead Sports Centre, on the banks of the River Thames, as start and/or finish, but recent races have used Green Park Business Park and the adjacent Madejski Stadium, both to the south of Reading, for these purposes.

Leaving the town centre by Oxford Road and a steep climb up Russell Street, the course then loops around West Reading until the  marker. The course then heads back south to the Madejski Stadium, where it finishes within the stadium.

Records 

The current male course record is 61 minutes 19 seconds, by Patrick Makau in 2008. The female record is 69 mins 35 seconds, set by Liz Yelling in 2008. The male wheelchair record is 45 minutes 59 seconds, set by David Weir in 2006, while the female wheelchair record is 65 minutes 17 seconds, set by Mel Nicholls in 2015.

Winners

Notes

References

External links 

Reading Half Marathon official website
Reading Half Marathon Forums at realbuzz.com
Interactive Map of Reading Half Marathon
Video report on the 2011 half-marathon

Half marathons in the United Kingdom
Half Marathon
Athletics competitions in England
1983 establishments in England
Recurring sporting events established in 1983